Films in the Philippines derive income mainly from theatrical exhibitions as revenues from home video, television broadcast rights and merchandising share a small portion of the studio earnings. Even more, unlike in the United States and other territories, gross receipts of movies in the country were not officially disclosed in detail through the years. Third-party organizations that focus on box-office statistics were not present in the industry until the website Box Office Mojo started providing comprehensive weekly performance of releases in 2007. Although the website is a reliable source, it does not summarize the highest grosses of all time for the reason that its scope is limited to the Metro Manila Film Festival, an annual event during December to January.

Top 20 films
The table below shows the top 20 highest-grossing local and foreign films in the Philippines-based from data gathered by Box Office Mojo:
Color key

Note: All figures are in Philippine Peso.

High-grossing films by year

Local films 
The table below shows the top 10 highest-grossing Filipino films in the Philippines based from data gathered by Box Office Mojo and other reliable sources:

Note: All figures are in Philippine Peso.

Box-office number-one films by year
The following are the highest-grossing box-office films (local and foreign films combined) per year:

 2008
 2009
 2010
 2011
 2012
 2013
 2014
 2015

Highest-grossing Filipino films by year
The following are the highest-grossing Filipino films per year:
 2011
 2012
 2013
 2014
 2015
 2016
 2017
 2018
 2019
 2020
 2022

See also
List of highest-grossing Philippine films

References 

Philippines
Lists of Philippine films